Antropovsky District  is an administrative and municipal district (raion), one of the twenty-four in Kostroma Oblast, Russia. It is located in the center of the oblast. Its administrative center is the rural locality (a settlement) of Antropovo. Population:  9,088 (2002 Census);  The population of Antropovo accounts for 50.1% of the district's population.

References

Notes

Sources

Districts of Kostroma Oblast